Fluadinazolam is a benzodiazepine derivative developed in 1973, with sedative and anxiolytic effects. It is a derivative of the never commercially marketed benzodiazepine adinazolam and has similarly been sold as a designer drug.

See also 
 Flualprazolam
 Flubromazepam
 Fluclotizolam
 Fludiazepam
 Flutemazepam

References 

Designer drugs
GABAA receptor positive allosteric modulators
Fluoroarenes
Heterocyclic compounds with 3 rings
Nitrogen heterocycles
Chloroarenes